The Wagiman, also spelt Wagoman, Wagaman, Wogeman, and other variants, are an Aboriginal Australian people of the Northern Territory.

Language

The Wagiman language is a language isolate. It has been contrasted for its comparative roughness to the smooth, euphonious sound of Marrithiel spoken down country by the Marrithiyal people.

Country
Their frontier to the west, west of Oooloo, lay on the Daly River Crossing close to  Mount Nancar, a place where they were accustomed to meet up with the neighbouring tribes, the Kamor and Ngolokwangga. It was considered a stony country.

Social organisation
The western tribes of the Wagiman were called collectively the Wongkakaringa, according to Tindale.

Alternative names
 Wagaman, Wageman, Wogeman
 Wongkakaringa
 Ongkakaringa

Notes

Citations

Sources

Aboriginal peoples of the Northern Territory